Adriano Maria Correia Gomes de Oliveira, GCIH, ComL, or just Adriano (April 9, 1942 – October 16, 1982) was a Portuguese musician, born to a conservative Roman Catholic family in Porto. His family moved to Avintes after his birth. He went to Coimbra to study at the University of Coimbra, and eventually dropped out, albeit being involved in the student activism and Coimbra fado music.

Adriano was part of a generation of composers and singers of political songs that used music and lyrics to fight against the Estado Novo dictatorial regime. For that, he became famous among the pro-democratic resistance and was persecuted by the political police, PIDE, for his anti-dictatorial actions. Adriano was a personal friend of musicians Zeca Afonso, Padre Fanhais, Sérgio Godinho, and Luísa Basto, with whom he collaborated in the recording of many albums.

His first recording, Fado de Coimbra, was released in 1963, accompanied by António Portugal and Rui Pato. In this record he performs the first rendition of Trova do Vento Que Passa, with poetry by Manuel Alegre, which would become a sort of anthem of resistance to the dictatorship. In 1967 he recorded the album Adriano Correia de Oliveira with, among other songs, "Canção com Lágrimas".

During his military service in 1969, O Canto e as Armas, with poetry by Manuel Alegre, was released followed in 1970 by Cantaremos and Gente de Aqui e de Agora in 1971. After the Carnation Revolution, the single "Que Nunca Mais" with poems by Manuel da Fonseca was released. The record, directed and produced by Fausto Bordalo Dias, includes a rare participation of guitarist Carlos Paredes. That year, he was nominated artist of the year by Musicweek.

Adriano was also a member of the Portuguese Communist Party and participated many times in the Avante! Festival annual fest. He was a close friend of the socialist Manuel Alegre, who wrote many of his lyrics. He died in Avintes at the age of 40 due to a vascular accident.

Albums

1967 – "Adriano Correia de Oliveira"
1969 – O canto e as armas
E de súbito um sino
Raiz
E a carne se fez verbo
E o bosque se fez barco
Peregrinação
A batalha de Alcácer-Quibir
Regresso
Canção da fronteira
Por aquele caminho
Canto da nossa tristeza
Trova do vento que passa N.2
As mãos
Post-scriptum
1970 – Cantaremos
Cantar de emigração
Saudade pedra e espada
Fala do homem nascido
O Sol p'rguntou à Lua
Canção para o meu amor não se perder no mercado da concorrência
Lágrima de preta
Canção com lágrimas
Cantar para um pastor
Como hei-de amar serenamente
Sapateia
A noite dos poetas
1971 – Gente de aqui e de agora
Emigração
E alegre se fez triste
O senhor morgado
Cana verde
A vila de Alvito
Canção tão simples
Cantiga de amigo
Para Rosalia
Roseira brava
História do quadrilheiro Manuel Domingos Louzeiro
1975 – Que nunca mais
Tejo que levas as águas
O senhor gerente
As balas
No vale escuro
Tu e eu meu amor
Recado a Helena
Dona Abastança
Cantiga de Montemaior
P'ra a frente
1980 – Cantigas Portuguesas

References

1942 births
1982 deaths
People from Vila Nova de Gaia
Portuguese Communist Party politicians
Portuguese anti-fascists
20th-century Portuguese male singers
University of Coimbra alumni